Kentucky Route 737 (KY 737) is a  
state highway in northwestern Grayson and southern Breckinridge counties in west central Kentucky. The route runs from KY 259 in northern Leitchfield to the same route southeast of McDaniels via Lilac and Fisher. The route crosses Rough River Lake at the Grayson—Breckinridge county line.

Major intersections

See also

References

0737
Transportation in Grayson County, Kentucky
Transportation in Breckinridge County, Kentucky